Zu Ji was the eldest son of King Wu Ding but despite his kingly title he never succeeded his father as a Shang dynasty King of China. In later texts he is known as Xiao Ji, while contemporary inscriptions record his name as Jie.

In the Records of the Grand Historian he was said by Sima Qian to have died in distant exile during the twenty-fifth year of his father's reign.

Oracle script inscriptions on bones unearthed at Yinxu confirm his lineage and his failure to succeed to the throne.

References

Shang dynasty people